Skillshare is an online learning community based in the United States for people who want to learn from educational videos. The courses, which are not accredited, are only available through paid subscription.

The majority of courses focus on interaction rather than lecturing, with the primary goal of learning by completing a project. The main course categories include creative arts, design, entrepreneurship, lifestyle and technology.

History

Michael Karnjanaprakorn and Malcolm Ong started Skillshare in New York City, New York in November 2010; the site was live in April 2011. Previously, Karnjanaprakorn led the product team at Hot Potato, a social media product bought by Facebook. Ong was the product manager at OMGPop. In August 2011, Skillshare raised $3.1 million in Series A funding led by Union Square Ventures and Spark Capital. In late 2013, Skillshare had raised $4.65 million in funding, and $6 million by February 2014, with financing co-led by Union Square Ventures and Spark Capital.  Total funding reached $10 million.

Skillshare held the Penny Conference in April 2012, a one-day discussion on the current educational system and how to reform it, with Michael Karnjanaprakorn, Codecademy’s cofounder Zach Sims, and Pencils of Promise founder Adam Braun as speakers.

Skillshare launched 15 self-paced, online courses in August 2012, with students collaborating to complete a project. By November 2013, it hosted over 250 courses, and launched its School of Design.

Skillshare collaborated with Levi's to launch the School of MakeOurMark in October 2013, focusing on individual creativity with courses in photography, tattooing, and various forms of illustration.

In March 2014, Skillshare moved to a membership model for $9.95 a month. Later that year, the company announced a new open platform, where anyone could be a course instructor, and a free membership option to watch a limited amount of class content each month.

In May 2016, Skillshare raised $12 million in Series B funding. The company raised a further $28 million in Series C funding in July 2018 ($20 million in equity and $8 million in venture debt).

As of March 2019, Skillshare had over 27,000 premium classes and more than 2,000 free classes available. The platform has introduced the "Groups" feature that allows members to connect with other creators, share work, and take skills to the next level through engaging discussions and prompts.

In September 2021, Skillshare discontinued the option to offer classes for free and required users to have either a paid membership or free trial to access all courses (including classes that were previously available for free).

Courses

Skillshare organizes courses into advertising, business, design, fashion and style, film and video, food and drink, music, photography, gaming, technology, and writing and publishing, often taught by industry leaders. All online courses are self-paced.

Notable instructors include Seth Godin (entrepreneurship), Jessica Hische (lettering), 
Susan Orlean (creative non-fiction), Young Guru (audio mixing and recording), Yuko Shimizu (inking and drawing techniques),  Marc Ecko (entrepreneurship and brand creation), Gary Vaynerchuk (social media strategy), Guy Kawasaki (entrepreneurship) and  Paula Scher (graphic design).

In June 2018, the company launched Skillshare Originals, a collection of courses produced by The Skillshare's in-house team.

References

External links
 

Internet properties established in 2011
Technology companies established in 2010
Education companies established in 2010
2010 establishments in New York City
Technology companies based in New York City
Educational technology companies of the United States
Learning programs
Freelance marketplace websites
Subscription services
Online marketplaces of the United States
YouTube sponsors